Virginia's 60th House of Delegates district elects one of 100 seats in the Virginia House of Delegates, the lower house of Virginia's bicameral state legislature. Located in Southside Virginia bordering North Carolina, District 60 represents Charlotte, Halifax, and Prince Edward counties, as well as part of Campbell County. The seat is currently held by Republican James E. Edmunds II.

Electoral history

2001 
Republican Clarke Hogan was elected to represent the 60th district.

2009 
Hogan decided not to run for re-election, leaving an empty seat for which Republican James R. Edmunds Jr. was the only candidate on the November ballot.

2017 
In the November 2017 election, Edmunds was challenged by Democrat Jamaal Johnston.

2019 
Edmunds was re-elected with 66% of the vote, defeating first-time candidate Democrat Janie Zimmerman.

References

60
Charlotte County, Virginia
Halifax County, Virginia
Prince Edward County, Virginia
Campbell County, Virginia